Asterix and the Roman Agent ("Discord") is the fifteenth volume of the Asterix comic book series, by René Goscinny (stories) and Albert Uderzo (illustrations). It first appeared as a serial in Pilote magazine issues 531–552 in 1970 and was translated into English in 1972.

Plot summary
The resistance of the Gaulish village against the Romans causes friction between dictator Julius Caesar and the Roman Senate, whose power had been reduced by Julius Caesar. With their Magic Potion which gives them superhuman strength and is known only to their druid Getafix, they easily stand up against Rome and her laws.

At a meeting with his associates, it is suggested to Caesar that causing internal conflict between the Gauls will lead to their breakdown. He is then told by another Official about Tortuous Convolvulus, a natural troublemaker whose mere presence causes arguments, quarrels and fights. This had him sentenced to the lions in the circus, but his ability had the lions eat each other and he is still in prison. Impressed by his abilities, Caesar sends him to the Gauls. On the way, Convolvulus has the whole ship arguing, from the captain to the galley slaves; and when the pirates attack the ship, Convolvulus represents one of them as having been bribed earlier by himself, and thus provokes them to sink their own ship. The pirate chief realises their mistake, and comments that they don't even need the Gauls to make fools of themselves.

In the Gaulish village, things are being organised for Chief Vitalstatistix's birthday, whom all enjoy except Impedimenta, who complains against the acquisition of useless presents including a mounting collection of swords, shields, stuffed fish, and menhirs. Arriving in Gaul, Convolvulus moves into the nearby Roman camp of Aquarium and gets a description of the village inhabitants. He then gives a valuable vase to Asterix whom he describes as the "most important man in the village", to the annoyance of Chief Vitalstatistix. The other villagers take this announcement seriously, until Impedimenta fights with the village's other women over their husbands' relative importances, and then privately dismisses her husband as a failure. Further rumours lead to the belief by many in the village that Asterix, who is close to Getafix the druid, has revealed the secret of the druid's Magic Potion to the Romans. Suspicion and paranoia increase, until the banquet to celebrate the Chief's birthday is held in sullen silence.

Leading this distrust are Fulliautomatix the blacksmith, Geriatrix the elder, and their wives. When Fullautomatix and Unhygienix spy on the Romans, they see a mock 'potion' being given to Roman soldiers; and when their presence is noted, Convolvulus has a small legionary pretend to knock out his huge comrade Magnumopus, causing the two Gauls to flee back to the village. As a result, the Roman troops of Aquarium believe that they have the Magic Potion and insist on drinking the substitute. The real turning point in this ruse occurs when some of the deceived villagers voice their suspicions that Asterix and Getafix gave the secret of the Magic Potion to the Romans, which gives Asterix and Getafix an excuse to announce a self-imposed exile, with Obelix accompanying them, wherein their purpose is to expose Convolvulus and teach the other Gauls a lesson in trust. Asterix and Getafix then confront Convolvulus and announce that they and Obelix shall leave the region (thus leaving the other Gauls defenceless). Taking them at their word, Convolvulus persuades the Roman commander, Centurion Platypus, to attack the village. The Gauls meanwhile take the Romans' fake potion back to the village, where it is proven useless and the ruse proven false. Convolvulus sees this and informs Platypus, who calls for an immediate attack, but Getafix make some genuine Magic Potion. Platypus summons reinforcements after Asterix and Obelix repel his garrison.

After drinking the real Magic Potion, the Gaulish villagers defeat all four of the Roman garrisons that surround them. After winning the fight, Asterix, Getafix and Vitalstatistix thank Convolvulus for having "kept his word" and give him the vase he gave Asterix earlier. This tricks the Roman commander into believing that Convolvulus deliberately engineered their defeat. Convolvulus is sent back to Rome for punishment, but there is a strong hint that his peculiar talent will help him escape his sentence, since he is already causing arguments on the ship taking him back.

In the village, Vitalstatistix apologizes to Asterix, and it is agreed to hold another birthday for Vitalstatistix himself. To test the villagers' conviction, Asterix arranges that Obelix carry him on a shield, after the fashion customary to Vitalstatistix, and thus causes another quarrel among the villagers over which of the men is the most heroic. When questioned by Vitalstatistix, Asterix claims to have merely been "test[ing]" the shield intended as the chief's birthday present. With all reconciled, the story ends with the traditional banquet, which doubles for a better celebration of Vitalstatistix's birthday.

In other languages
Brazilian Portuguese: A Cizânia
Catalan: La zitzània
Croatian: Zavadi pa vladaj (Divide and rule)
Czech: Nesvár
Danish: Lus i Skindpelsen
Dutch: De intrigant
Finnish: Asterix ja riidankylväjä (Asterix and the Sower of Arguments)
German: Streit um Asterix (The Asterix Controversy)
Greek: Η διχόνοια
Hebrew: הסכסכן מרומא
Hindi: Estriks aur Roman ghuspaithiyaa 
Indonesian: Sang Penghasut
Irish: Asterix agus an Cealgaire
Italian: Asterix e la zizzania
Latin: Tumultus de Asterige
Norwegian: Brann i rosenes leir
Polish: Niezgoda
Pontic Greek: Το Ζιζάνιον
Portuguese: A Zaragata
Spanish: La cizaña
Serbian: Завади па владај/Zavadi pa vladaj (Divide and Rule)
Swedish: Asterix och tvedräkten
Turkish: Asteriks Fitneci

Reception 
On Goodreads, Asterix and the Roman Agent has a score of 4.15 out of 5. It was described by the screenwriter Russell T Davies as "the finest book ever made".

References

External links 
 

Roman Agent, Asterix and the
Works originally published in Pilote
Literature first published in serial form
1970 graphic novels
Works by René Goscinny
Comics by Albert Uderzo
Psychological warfare
Depictions of Julius Caesar in comics
Cultural depictions of Marcus Junius Brutus